Eagle Point is a  summit in the Olympic Mountains and is located in Clallam County of Washington state. It is set on Hurricane Ridge within Olympic National Park. It's situated midway between Steeple Rock and Obstruction Peak,  to the southeast. Precipitation runoff drains into tributaries of the Elwha River and Morse Creek, thence into the Strait of Juan de Fuca.

Climate
Set in the north-central portion of the Olympic Mountains, Eagle Point is located in the marine west coast climate zone of western North America. Most weather fronts originate in the Pacific Ocean, and travel northeast toward the Olympic Mountains. As fronts approach, they are forced upward by the peaks of the Olympic Range, causing them to drop their moisture in the form of rain or snowfall (Orographic lift). As a result, the Olympics experience high precipitation, especially during the winter months in the form of snowfall. During winter months, weather is usually cloudy, but, due to high pressure systems over the Pacific Ocean that intensify during summer months, there is often little or no cloud cover during the summer. Because of maritime influence, snow tends to be wet and heavy, resulting in high avalanche danger.

Geology

The Olympic Mountains are composed of obducted clastic wedge material and oceanic crust, primarily Eocene sandstone, turbidite, and basaltic oceanic crust. The mountains were sculpted during the Pleistocene era by erosion and glaciers advancing and retreating multiple times.

See also

 Olympic Mountains
 Geology of the Pacific Northwest

Gallery

References

External links
 Weather forecast: Eagle Point
 

Mountains of Washington (state)
Olympic Mountains
Mountains of Clallam County, Washington
Landforms of Olympic National Park